The Lishui River Bridge (Lishuihe Bridge) (澧水大桥) is a suspension bridge near Zhangjiajie, in the Hunan Province of China. The bridge spans  over the Lishui River gorge between the Yongding District and the Yongshun County. The bridge is part of an extension of the G5513 Changsha–Zhangjiajie Expressway to Huayuan that cut the 8 hour travel time between Zhangjiajie and Chongqing in half. With  of clearance above the river the bridge is one of the world's highest bridges.

Construction
Construction of the bridge began around 2009/2010. An innovative technique was used to carry the pilot line across the gorge by rocket in early 2011. This technique was first used on the nearby Sidu River Bridge. On July 11, 2012, the final truss section was connected completing the main structure of the bridge. The bridge and associated expressway were opened in December 2013.

Tourism
A rest stop and viewing area was built at the eastern end of the bridge. It provides panoramic views of the bridge and the Lishui River Gorge below.

See also
 List of longest suspension bridge spans
 List of highest bridges in the world
 List of largest bridges in China

References

Bridges in Hunan
Suspension bridges in China
Bridges completed in 2013